The State Register of Heritage Places is maintained by the Heritage Council of Western Australia. As of 2023, 71 places are heritage-listed in the Shire of Kent, of which none are on the State Register of Heritage Places.

List
As of 2023, following places are heritage listed in the Shire of Kent:

References

Kent
Great Southern (Western Australia)